The PMI Group is a holding company whose primary subsidiary is the PMI Mortgage Insurance Co. (PMI). The company was founded in 1972 by Preston Martin and is headquartered in Walnut Creek, California.

PMI has a 50% equity ownership in CMG Mortgage Insurance Company, founded in 1994 as a JV with CUNA Mutual Group, and CMG Mortgage Assurance Company (collectively CMG MI), a provider of private mortgage insurance to the credit union industry.

In October 2011, Arizona insurance regulators seized PMI's main subsidiary and reduced claim payouts to 50% of the claim made with the balance of each claim being deferred. Shortly afterward, PMI filed for bankruptcy.

References

Financial services companies based in California
Financial services companies established in 1972
1972 establishments in California
Companies based in Contra Costa County, California
Walnut Creek, California
Companies that filed for Chapter 11 bankruptcy in 2011